Baruch Tenembaum (born 9 July 1933, in Argentina at Las Palmeras colony, a Santa Fe provincial settlement for Jewish immigrants escaping from the Russian pogroms of 1880), the grandson and son of Jewish gauchos, he studied in Buenos Aires and Rosario.

He is best known as an interfaith activist, most recently with the International Raoul Wallenberg Foundation.

In an interview to Zenit News Agency, he was asked about his nomination for the Nobel Prize, to what he replied: "Who am I?...just a descendant of slaves". Tenembaum characterized his life as being dedicated "to thank those human beings who saved lives, who risked themselves. [...] At the Wallenberg Foundation we work intensively to discover, among others, the exceptional deeds of those heroic human beings."

The Wallenberg Foundation aims to pay tribute to the "Saviors of the Holocaust", recognizing those who "risked their lives and freedom to save thousands of Jews from a certain death in hands of the Nazis during the Second World War", the site of the foundation explains. Since 2005 the foundation's charter has expanded to highlight the legacies of rescuers in other major conflicts, such as the victims of the Armenian Genocide.

Baruch Tenembaum is a resident of Gibraltar and a member of its small and bustling Jewish community. From Gibraltar, he continues his relentless voluntary work to further the mission of the International Raoul Wallenberg Foundation.

Education and activism 

In 1952, Tenembaum graduated from the Higher Institute of Judaic Religious Studies. As a teacher and a professor he taught Hebrew and Yiddish language and literature, the Torah, the Prophets and Mishnah.  In 1955, he was appointed Director of the Moises Ville Teacher's Seminar in the province of Santa Fe where he taught the Old Testament and philosophy.

He was First General Director of the Argentine-Israeli Cultural Institute (ICAI). Important undertakings in the field of education were set in motion and announced from his office, including bar mitzvah tours and the founding of the Tarbut School, among others. He organized the first Latin-American Bible contest. He translated Spanish classics into Hebrew and 'Haskala' literature into Spanish.

He launched the idea of establishing interfaith monuments by promoting the creation of a fresco by the Argentine master painter Raúl Soldi at the main church in Nazareth, which was completed in 1968.

In 1965, he was a Latin American promoter of the first visit by a Pope to Jerusalem. Granted an award for his work by the Vatican, he was invited to a ceremony at the Vatican City and was received by Pope Paul VI on January 13, 1965. At a separate public ceremony, Monsignor Antonio Caggiano, Cardinal Primate of Argentina, presented him with an Argentine Church award, granted for the very first time for a Jew Jew in Argentina.

Along with writer Jorge Luis Borges, he founded la Casa Argentina en Jerusalem, with branches in Buenos Aires and Jerusalem. He has worked on interreligious initiatives with Rabbi Guillermo Schlesinger, Father Carlos Cuccetti, Pastor Sosa, and Father Ernesto Segura, who was the first President of Argentine House in Israel.

Tenembaum's Jewish and humanist education is a result of a deep devotion of his teacher and mentor, Rabbi Jacobo Fink, an orthodox rabbi who initiated him in the Jewish knowledge and the Kabbalah, and guided him all of his life. Even if they were far away (he was Great Rabbi in Rio de Janeiro, Brazil, Haifa, Israel, and Buenos Aires, Argentina) so close was their relationship that every Friday they had a conversation, which was never ever postponed until the last day of his life.

In 2009 world gambling operator Ladbrokes gave Baruch Tenembaum a 1/40 odds to win the Nobel Peace Prize, as opposed to 1/20 to the actual winner, US President Barack Obama.

He was the co-author, together with Dr. Shalom Rosenberg, professor of philosophy at the Hebrew University at Jerusalem, of the book 'Holy Places in the Holy Land'.

Kidnapping 

On January 31, 1976, Baruch Tenembaum was kidnapped by rightwing extremists belonging to the Triple-A (Argentine Anti-subversive Alliance) a clandestine state terrorist organization founded under the aegis of José López Rega, a sinister character of great influence during the government of President Isabel Perón. Together with members of the military and police, the Triple-A supposedly began the "disappearance" of people in Argentina which, by the end of the military dictatorship in 1983, came to a total of 30,000 persons.  The kidnappers allegedly accused him of "infecting the Catholic Church with the virus of Judaism" and "of spreading ideas of alleged coexistence so as to destroy Christian principles" through his inter-faith work, which they claimed, "leads to the destruction of the Creole republic". Additionally, they accused him of being a part of the sinister "conspiracy" known as the Plan Andina.

In a dramatic turn of events, his wife Perla volunteered as a hostage and was also kidnapped herself.  While he was in captivity Father Horacio Moreno spoke out for him, calling for his freedom from his pulpit at Fatima Church and later holding a face-to-face meeting with the kidnappers who self-defined themselves as "concerned Catholics". Finally, he was liberated. Since then Mr. Tenembaum resides outside of Argentina, from where he leads the international affairs of the Wallenberg Foundation.

Activism and events 

Baruch Tenembaum promoted the idea of installing a memorial mural dedicated to the victims of the Holocaust inside the Buenos Aires Cathedral. This mural is the first monument of its kind, it contains Jewish religious texts and was inaugurated by the then Cardinal of Argentina and Archbishop of Buenos Aires Antonio Quarracino and unveiled by Baruch Tenembaum and Lech Wałęsa, Nobel Peace Prize, in April 1997. In February 1998 Cardinal Quarracino died and a unique homage of survivors of the Holocaust over the grave of a Primate Cardinal in a Catholic Cathedral was held on April, that same year.

So outstanding was the impact of this mural that on 2004, in a moving ceremony, the Vater-Unser Church in Berlin inaugurated a replica of this memorial.

Baruch Tenembaum was invited by the Secretary-General of the United Nations, Kofi Annan, to a meeting specially held on the day of the 90th anniversary of the birth of the Swedish diplomat Raoul Wallenberg. During the meeting, that took place at the Secretary General's residence in New York, Tenembaum presented a Commemorative Medal specially commissioned and coined to mark the anniversary. Mrs. Nane Annan, the wife of the world leader and niece of the Swedish diplomat, also attended the event. This was the second time Kofi Annan met the founder of the IRWF.

Tenembaum continued his work on humanitarian causes searching for gentiles who helped Jews during World War II.  After eight years in self-imposed exile, and following the fall of the military dictatorship, he renewed his visits to Argentina.

Tenembaum was one of the founders of the International Raoul Wallenberg Foundation.  Raoul Wallenberg was the Swedish diplomat who disappeared in the Soviet Gulag after saving the lives of thousands of Jews and other persecuted by the Nazis during World War II.  The foundation honors Wallenberg's memory, and continues to hunt for him or his remains.  The Wallenberg Foundation also honors other righteous gentiles who saved Jews during The Holocaust or shoah.

The most outstanding cases of saviors of the Holocaust brought up by the foundation are Uruguayan Dr. Alejandro Pou, Polish savior Irena Sendler, Luiz Martins de Sousa Dantas (whose story was investigated by Brazilian professor Fabio Koiffman- awarded by the IRWF), and especially Monsignor Angelo Roncalli, in whose honor The Angelo Giuseppe Roncalli International Committee, an international grouping of distinguished scholars, historians, journalists, and other personalities, was founded within the framework of the IRWF. Its mission is to carry out investigations into the rescue actions performed during the Second World War in Istanbul by the then Vatican Nuncio who later became Pope John XXIII.

In 2001, under the auspices of Casa Argentina en Israel - Tierra Santa and the International Raoul Wallenberg Foundation, the website www.bialikencastellano.com was created, which became the most comprehensive and important online source on the life and work from the famed Israeli national writer and poet.

In October 2003, United States Congressman Tom Lantos made a speech on the floor of the House of Representatives to honor Tenembaum, and had a fuller tribute inserted into the Congressional Record Wallenberg apparently was instrumental in saving Lantos from the Nazis. Tenembaum also received the Royal Order of the Polar Star from H.M. King Carl XVI Gustaf of Sweden.  Tenembaum has had an audience with the Pope.  He frequently has letters to the editor published.

On July 9, 2014, the United States Congress presented the Congressional Gold Medal to Raoul Wallenberg, following an initiative by the International Raoul Wallenberg Foundation.  The ceremony took place at the Capitol Rotunda, with the presence of living relatives of Raoul, including his half-sister, Nina Lagergren, and Matti von Dardel (widow of his late half-brother, Professor Guy von Dardel). In a previous luncheon ceremony at the Congress, a distinguished group of dignitaries, senators, congressmen, and diplomats recognized the distinctive role played by the International Raoul Wallenberg Foundation.

Baruch Tenembaum and Elsa Kononowicz are the parents of Mookie Tenembaum, a published philosopher, lawyer and conceptual artist, Yoav Tenembaum, an historian and author, and Abigail Tenembaum, a strategy consultant.  He also has six grandchildren and one great-grandson.

Honours
Among the decorations received it is worth mentioning the following:
The Order of the Croatian Star with the Effigy of Katarina Zrinska, Croatia
Order of Merit, Romania
Royal Order of the Polar Star, Sweden
Order of Merit, Portugal
Order Bernardo O´Higgins, Chile
Cross "Komandorski" of Merit, Poland
Tribute from the House of Representatives U.S. Congress, United States
Distinguished Citizen of the Province of Santa Fe, Argentina
Distinguished Citizen of the City of Buenos Aires, Argentina

References

1933 births
People from San Cristóbal Department
Raoul Wallenberg
Argentine Jews
Illustrious Citizens of Buenos Aires
Living people